Go Gwang-seon (born 1 May 1969) is a South Korean rower. He competed in the men's eight event at the 1988 Summer Olympics.

References

1969 births
Living people
South Korean male rowers
Olympic rowers of South Korea
Rowers at the 1988 Summer Olympics
Place of birth missing (living people)